The men's road race at the 1956 UCI Road World Championships was the 23rd edition of the event. The race took place on Sunday 26 August 1956 in Copenhagen, Denmark. The race was won by Rik Van Steenbergen of Belgium.

Final classification

References

Men's Road Race
UCI Road World Championships – Men's road race